Brahma Kuti's temple is a temple near Kanpur, India dedicated to Brahma. It is the only Brahma temple in the area other than the small temple of Brahmeswar Mahadeva on the Brahmavarta ghat. It is located on the bank of the River Ganga.

References

Hindu temples in Uttar Pradesh
Brahma temples
Hindu temples in Kanpur
Religious buildings and structures in Kanpur